Rogelio Rueda Sánchez (born 17 December 1964) is a Mexican politician and lawyer affiliated with the PRI. As of 2013 he served as Senator of the LX and LXI Legislatures of the Mexican Congress representing Colima. He also served as Deputy during the LIX Legislature, as well as the municipal president of Manzanillo.

References

1964 births
Living people
Politicians from Colima
20th-century Mexican lawyers
Members of the Senate of the Republic (Mexico)
Members of the Chamber of Deputies (Mexico)
Institutional Revolutionary Party politicians
21st-century Mexican politicians
National Autonomous University of Mexico alumni
Municipal presidents in Colima